Amboy Road is a major north-south artery along the South-East Shore of the New York City borough of Staten Island. Amboy Rd. was originally part of an extensive Native American trail system used by Algonquian peoples during prehistoric times. Along with parts of Richmond Road and all of Vanderbilt Avenue, Amboy Road forms the last leg of Staten Island's colonial-era eastern corridor that predates the newer, straighter, and wider Hylan Boulevard. The three roads that make up the corridor share a common numbering system, i.e. Richmond Road's numbers start where Vanderbilt Avenue's leave off and Amboy Road's numbers start where Amboy Road forks away from Richmond Road. This numbering system includes the numerically highest of street addresses in New York City.
Other roads that fork off of this corridor are: St. Paul's Avenue, Van Duzer Street, Targee Street, Rockland Avenue, Bloomingdale Road, and Richmond Valley Road. Amboy Road also runs within blocks of the Staten Island Railway for the majority of its length.

Amboy Road is served by the SIM15 express bus  and S57 local bus  in the northern section of the road, and the SIM26 express bus and S55 local bus in the southern section of the road.

References

Streets in Staten Island